Crazy Machines 2 is a puzzle video game developed by German studios Fakt Software and DTP Entertainment for Microsoft Windows, Nintendo DS, and iOS. It is the sequel to Crazy Machines.

Gameplay

The goal in Crazy Machines 2 is to solve a seemingly simple problem (cook a hot dog, pop a balloon) by constructing a Heath Robinson / Rube Goldberg-esque machine. The 3D game relies heavily on in-game physics and utilises NVidia PhysX. For any given puzzle, the player is provided with a collection of items e.g. ramps, springs, steam engines, electrical devices, gears, belts, and a large selection of other mechanical devices for converting and directing raw energy into useful motion. On the completion of each puzzle, the player is rewarded with points and a gold, silver, or bronze lug nut. Not only does the created machine have to perform the assigned primary task, but might also complete one or more of the optional secondary tasks thus earning more points.

Reception

The PC version received above-average reviews according to the review aggregation website Metacritic. GameZone were impressed by the number of puzzles, saying, "Now the game has like 200 puzzles to complete, which is an astonishing number," and that the game was "Easy to use, forward thinking and inventive," being "really a delight to play." IGN were less keen, saying, "The core gameplay mechanics are solid," but "Crazy Machines 2 is at times poorly constructed."

See also
Crazy Machines
The Incredible Machine (series)

References

External links
Crazy Machines 2 official site

2007 video games
DTP Entertainment games
IOS games
Nintendo DS games
Puzzle video games
Single-player video games
Video game sequels
Video games developed in Germany
Video games using PhysX
Viva Media games
Windows games
Fakt Software games